Ilhéu do Farol (also: Ilhéu da Ponta de São Lourenço) is an uninhabited islet off the easternmost point of Madeira Island, Portugal. It is part of the municipality of Machico. The islet lies adjacent to the east of the larger Ilhéu da Cevada, which lies directly east of the rocky peninsula Ponta de São Lourenço. The islet is 107 meters high. A lighthouse stands at the eastern extremity of the island. The islet is part of the protected area Reserva Natural da Ponta de São Lourenço.

References

Islands of the Autonomous Region of Madeira